Paolo Alessandro Reyna Lea (born 13 October 2001) is a Peruvian footballer who plays as a left-back for Melgar.

Career statistics

Club

Notes

References

2001 births
Living people
People from Tacna
Peruvian footballers
Peru youth international footballers
Association football defenders
Peruvian Primera División players
Coronel Bolognesi footballers
FBC Melgar footballers